Le' Mac is a 24-storey (Excluding roof structure) commercial and residential building in the Westlands district of Nairobi, Kenya.

Le' Mac is owned by Mark Properties, a property developer in Nairobi.  The tower was financed through private equity at a total of KSh. 3.5 billion (approximately US$35,000,000 as of 2015). L'e Mac's 30 levels are divided as:
 Three basement parking levels
 Ground floor banking and café amenities
 Storeys 1 through 6: open plan office space intended for banks, showrooms and other offices
 Storey 7: service level
 Storeys 8 through 23: residential
 Storeys 24 through 27: pool, gym, sauna/steam room and restaurant

References

External links
 

Buildings and structures in Nairobi
Skyscraper office buildings in Kenya
Skyscrapers in Kenya
Residential skyscrapers